The Ouray City Hall and Walsh Library are a pair of buildings in downtown Ouray, Colorado, United States.  Located on 6th Avenue between 3rd and 4th Streets, they are together listed on the National Register of Historic Places.

History
Constructed in 1900, the city hall was built as a miniature replica of Independence Hall in Philadelphia, Pennsylvania.  Thomas Walsh, founder of the Camp Bird Mine, donated a library which occupied the second floor.  The structure burned down in January 1950.  It was listed on the Register in 1975. A restoration effort in 1976 as part of the city of Ouray Centennial failed, but another restoration effort led by then-mayor Bill Fries (C.W. McCall) succeeded in restoring the historic facade in 1988.

References

External links
Ouray County Historical Society

City and town halls on the National Register of Historic Places in Colorado
Government buildings completed in 1899
Buildings and structures in Ouray County, Colorado
City and town halls in Colorado
Clock towers in Colorado
Libraries on the National Register of Historic Places in Colorado
1899 establishments in Colorado
National Register of Historic Places in Ouray County, Colorado
Libraries in Colorado